Václav Migas (16 September 1944 – 23 September 2000) was a Czech footballer.

During his career he played for AC Sparta Prague. He earned 8 caps for the Czechoslovakia national football team, and participated in the 1970 FIFA World Cup.

References

External links

1944 births
2000 deaths
Czech footballers
Czechoslovak footballers
Czechoslovakia international footballers
1970 FIFA World Cup players
AC Sparta Prague players

Association football defenders